ECHR may refer to:

 European Convention on Human Rights
 European Court of Human Rights, the international court which interprets the European Convention on Human Rights